The 4th Mediterranean Grand Prix was a motor race, run to Formula One rules, held on 15 August 1965 at the Autodromo di Pergusa, Sicily. The race was run over 60 laps of the circuit, and was won for the second year in succession by Swiss driver Jo Siffert in a Brabham BT11.

Results

 Masten Gregory was disqualified after a driver change with Giampiero Biscaldi.

References

Mediterranean Grand Prix
Mediterranean Grand Prix
1965 in Italian motorsport
August 1965 sports events in Europe